The Emily McPherson College of Domestic Economy was an Australian domestic science college for women, in Melbourne, Victoria.

It was officially opened on 27 April 1927 by The Duchess of York (later Queen Elizabeth The Queen Mother.) On 30 June 1979 it became part of the Royal Melbourne Institute of Technology and is known as RMIT Building 13 (Emily McPherson College).

History of the college

During the 1920s, Melbourne businessman Sir William McPherson donated £25,000 (≈ A$1.5 million today) towards the establishment of a college of domestic science exclusively for women; which was later named in honour of his wife Lady Emily McPherson.

The building opened in 1927, and was designed by then state architect Evan Smith, in simplified Neo-Grec architecture and Beaux-Arts style. The Ethel Osborne Wing opened in 1950, and was designed by then state architect Percy Everett.

Opening

The college, on the corner of Russell Street and Victoria Street adjacent to the Royal Melbourne Institute of Technology, was officially opened on 27 April 1927 by the Duchess of York (later Queen Elizabeth The Queen Mother), during a royal visit to Australia by her and her husband, the Duke of York (later George VI.)

The Age newspaper later estimated that a crowd of 5,000 people and dignitaries gathered outside the new college, with a guard of honour formed by students from schools as far afield as Ballarat and Bendigo, to witness the Duchess officially open the college with a gold key and unveil a commemorative plaque and bust of Lady McPherson:

Dr Ethel Osborne, who had invited the Duchess to open the college, then presented her with the first diploma issued by the college stating that the Duchess "had set all Australians an example of home life". Upon accepting the diploma, the Duchess thanked Dr Osborne and said "it will always be a delightful memento but one of which I am afraid I am not worthy!".

Present college building

On 30 June 1979, the college was amalgamated with the nearby expanding Royal Melbourne Institute of Technology (RMIT). Today, it remains a part of the RMIT City campus, and has been refurbished to house the RMIT Graduate School of Business.

The building is registered as "significant" and a "notable building" with the Victorian Heritage Register and the National Trust of Australia.

External links
The Emily McPherson Collection is a historical collection of cookery books and related ephemera housed as part of the Special Collection within the Swanston Library and RMIT Archives.
  Emily McPherson Collection on Research Data Australia

References

Texts:

 (see: Notes)

Notes:
 The sum listed via the Reserve Bank of Australia is an approximation (≈) determined by inflation in Australia leading up to the year 2007, from the year 1927 (the opening of the college).

RMIT University
RMIT University buildings
Former entities of RMIT University
Heritage-listed buildings in Melbourne
Buildings and structures in Melbourne City Centre
Former women's universities and colleges
Women's universities and colleges in Australia
Educational institutions established in 1927
University and college buildings completed in 1927
1927 establishments in Australia
Women in Melbourne